Mount Herman is a small unincorporated community in the Westfield Township of northeastern Surry County, North Carolina.  Prominent landmarks in the community include Mount Herman United Methodist Church and cemetery.

References

Unincorporated communities in Surry County, North Carolina
Unincorporated communities in North Carolina